Feildes Weir Lock (No5) is a lock on the River Lee Navigation located in Hoddesdon.

Location 
The lock is adjacent to the confluence of the River Lea and the River Stort at Feildes Weir.

The  Glen Faba lake is to the east of the lock.

Public access 
Vehicular access via Rattys Lane

Walking and cycle access via the towpath that forms part of the Lea Valley Walk

Public transport 
Rye House railway station

External links
 Glen Faba lake
 London canals- Feildes Weir lock
 Feildes Weir Lock - a history

Locks of the Lee Navigation
Locks in Hertfordshire